Auraiya is a constituency of the Uttar Pradesh Legislative Assembly covering the city of Auraiya in the Auraiya district of Uttar Pradesh, India.

Auraiya is one of five assembly constituencies in the Etawah Lok Sabha constituency. Since 2008, this assembly constituency is numbered 204 amongst 403 constituencies.

In 2017, Bharatiya Janta Party candidate Ramesh Diwakar won in last Assembly election of 2017 Uttar Pradesh Legislative Elections defeating Bahujan Samaj Party candidate Bhimrao Ambedkar by a margin of 31,862 votes.

The current MLA of the assembly constituency is Gudiya Katheriya, who won 2022 Uttar Pradesh Legislative Assembly election from Bhartiya Janta Party.

References

External links
 

Assembly constituencies of Uttar Pradesh
Auraiya